Dame Norma Jean Restieaux  (born 16 July 1934) is a New Zealand physician, medical researcher, cardiologist and author.

Early life 
Restieaux was born in the Dunedin suburb of St Kilda on 16 July 1934, the daughter of Frank Charles Restieaux (1911–1976) and Florence Jean May Restieaux (née Godfrey; 1908–1996). She was educated at Otago Girls' High School.

Career 
Restieaux studied medicine at the University of Otago, graduating Bachelor of Medical Science in 1958, and MB ChB in 1960. She was mentored by Professor John Hunter, Professor of Medicine at Otago in the early stages of her career. A cardiologist, Resieaux was head of the Cardiology Department at Dunedin Hospital and consultant cardiologist for the Otago Health Board and associate professor at the University of Otago. 

In 1999, Restieaux became the first female president of the New Zealand Medical Association.

Selected publications
She authored or co-authored the following:
 'Clinical outcome of older patients with acute coronary syndrome over the last three decades' Age Ageing 2006 35: 280–285; 
'Use of evidence-based management for acute coronary syndrome.' N Z Med J. 2005 Oct 7;118(1223):U1678. PMID: 16224502.
'Audit of a collaborative care model suggests patients with acute myocardial infarction are not disadvantaged by treatment in a rural hospital.' N Z Med J. 2002 Nov 8;115(1165):U239. PMID: 12552285.
'Differences in easily recognised coronary risk factors by age at first myocardial infarction.' N Z Med J. 1997 Sep 12;110(1051):339-40. PMID: 9323375.
'IDL Composition and Angiographically Determined Progression of Atherosclerotic Lesions During Simvastatin Therapy.'  Arterioscler Thromb Vasc Biol. 1998 Apr;18(4):577-83. doi: 10.1161/01.atv.18.4.577. PMID: 9555863.

Honours
In the 1992 Queen's Birthday Honours, Restieaux was appointed a Dame Commander of the Order of the British Empire, for services to cardiology.

References

External links
Interview with Restieaux in the Alexander Turnbull Library, 1993

1934 births
Living people
People from Dunedin in health professions
New Zealand Dames Commander of the Order of the British Empire
New Zealand cardiologists
University of Otago alumni
Academic staff of the University of Otago
New Zealand women medical doctors
Women medical researchers
20th-century New Zealand medical doctors
21st-century New Zealand medical doctors
20th-century women physicians
21st-century women physicians
People educated at Otago Girls' High School